James Oliver Burke (born 16 April 1994) is an English footballer who plays for Ossett United as a defender or midfielder. He previously played for Huddersfield Town and Bury.

Club career

Huddersfield Town
Born in Harrow, (Middlesex), Burke is a product of the Huddersfield Town academy. He had a loan spell at Radcliffe Borough in the 2012–13 season.

Bury
After finding places limited at Huddersfield, he was released just before the end of 2013, and then joined Football League Two side Bury and made his debut in the 3–0 win over Hartlepool United at Victoria Park on 1 January 2014.

Hyde United

Following his release by Bury at the end of the 2013–14 season, Burke signed for Hyde on 20 February 2015, making his debut against AFC Fylde on 21 February.

External links

1994 births
Living people
Sportspeople from Beverley
English footballers
Association football defenders
Radcliffe F.C. players
Bury F.C. players
English Football League players
Footballers from Yorkshire
Hyde United F.C. players
Huddersfield Town A.F.C. players